Cyboars is a 3D animated mini web-series, produced by Cyboars International, LLC. and debuting in late December 2011. The term ''Cyboar'' comes from the words Cyborg and Boar, as the pig/boar-like characters are turned into Cyborgs.

The Creative Team consists of Walter McDaniel as designer/art director, Wes Takashi as producer, Ian Powers as Action Director, Rick Hoberg as storyboard director, Sheldon Arnst as animation director, James Felder as writer/story editor, Jake Black as writer and Cedrick Chan as overseas lighting director.

Premise 
The Cyboars are 6 pig-like humanoid characters from the planet Stygor rebelling against the Bytrons, a bull-like race that has conquered the world. The Cyboars have crashed on earth and must rebuild their ship while simultaneously fighting against the Renegades, minions of the Bytrons.

The Wylde Pack 
Bushar, also known by the code name Bush hog, is an expert in battle strategy and is the leader of the Cyboars. His weapons include The Battle Bondolier, a bondolier containing slime slicks, blinding flare mines, and stink bombs. He also has The Mud Guns, mud-shooting pistols. His character design consists of a black and grey suit with brown belts wrapped around the thighs and chest, along with blue dots around the body and gray/white sunglasses.

Ardonna, also known by the code name Sparky, is a scientist, and is described as being ''smart and sassy''. She has ''cyboarnetics'' letting her hack into any machine. Her character design consists of a partly pink suit with long blonde hair.

Sen Sunar, also known by the code name Old Fang, is a martial arts master. Using his concentration, his sword, made from the tusk of a Stygorian dinosaur, can summon an energy ghost of the dinosaur which will then obey his commands. His character design consists of a purple and gray suit with two swords.

Sten-Kai, also known by the codename Stampede, is described as being the ''headstrong, wildboar'' member of the cyboars and is also described as being non-wise. His powers include ''cyboarnetic'' legs, allowing him to run faster than usual. His character design consists of a green and gray suit, along with orange hair

Kachonga, also known by the codename Hog Kong, is described as being ''the strong man of the Cyboars''. His powers include super strength and the ''Super-Sonic Stomp''. His character design consists of a purple and gray suit with spikes.

Anthar, also known by the codename Airboar, is a pilot described as having an ''ego bigger than the seven galaxies combined''. His powers include ''cyboarnetics'' that let him turn into a missile-firing, supersonic jet.

Episode list 
The Cyboars website states that 31 episodes have been made, however no information about the twenty-six episodes following the first five is given on the website.

Reception 
According to an article on the Cyboars website, the show exceeded 500,000 on-demand downloads six weeks after the launch of the first five episodes, and became the fastest growing series on the Kabillion network.

In other media
 Cyboars was first published as a comic in 1996, with a toyline and a 24-minute CGI animation produced by Imaginary Limitz and Funimation also being made in 1997.
 They are also mentioned in the book How to Survive a Sharknado and Other Unnatural Disasters: Fight Back When Monsters and Mother Nature Attack, although only the term 'Cyboars', and not the actual franchise.

References

Web series about cyborgs
American animated web series
American science fiction web series
American children's web series